Sulekha Hussain (1930 – 15 July 2014) was an acclaimed Urdu novelist from India. One of her granddaughters, Nimi Farook, is married to a Canadian citizen, Yasser Mohammed Ali Jinna, and lives currently in Toronto. Hussain wrote many novels and short stories.  She was nominated to the committee awarding fellowships in Urdu language by the Union Cultural Affairs Ministry in 2012.

Early life
She was born in Mattancherry, Kerala, India in 1930 to a Katchi Memon family. She lost her parents at very young age and was brought up by her grandfather Jani Sait. Her educational qualification was 4th standard, and studied in Zanana Madressa (Asia Bahi madressa), Mattancherry, Kochi. She published many novels and short stories in Urdu language that were appreciated in Urdu circles. Her writings have reached a large number of readers in Pakistan, Bangladesh, the Middle East, and north Indian states. Her novels Mere Sanam, Rah Akeli, and Aapa are famous works.

Publications
Novels
Rah Akeli
Dishvar Huva Jeena
Ek Khyab Hakhikhath
Marla he Kali

See also
List of Indian writers
List of Urdu writers

References

External links
Renowned Urdu writer Sulekha Hussain no more

1930 births
2014 deaths
Urdu-language writers from India
20th-century Indian women writers
20th-century Indian novelists
Women writers from Kerala
Writers from Kochi
Novelists from Kerala
Urdu-language novelists
People from Mattancherry